Consolini is an Italian surname. Notable people with the surname include:

Adolfo Consolini (1917–1969), Italian Olympic athlete
Nicolò Consolini (born 1984), Italian footballer
Eugenio Consolini (1913–1996), Italian noble
Domenico Consolini (1806–1884), Italian Roman Catholic bishop and cardinal
Giovanni Consolini (1818–1906), Italian composer
Joseph Consolini (born 1975), Entrepreneur 

Italian-language surnames